A number of Roman ports were known as portus magnus ("grand port") :
 Portus Magnus, Spain: modern Almería
 Portus Magnus, Algeria: modern Bethioua
 Portus Magnus, Egypt: modern Alexandria
 Portus Magnus (Mauretania), in the Roman province of Mauretania Caesariensis
 Magnus Portus: modern Bosham, near Chichester, England